Tiong Bahru Single Member Constituency was a constituency in Singapore. The constituency was formed in 1955 and was abolished in 1991

History 
In 1955, the Tiong Bahru Constituency was formed. In 1988, it was renamed as Tiong Bahru Single Member Constituency as part of Singapore's political reforms. In 1991, it was abolished.

Members of Parliament

Elections

Elections in 1950s

Historical maps

References 

Singaporean electoral divisions
Tiong Bahru